The following are the national records in athletics in Finland maintained by Finland's national athletics federation: Suomen Urheiluliitto (SUL).

Starting in 2016, Finnish indoor records superior to the outdoor record in the same event will be considered national records both indoors and outdoors. This rule only applies to records set in 2016 or later, and is not retroactively applied to older indoor records.

Outdoor

Key to tables:

+ = en route to a longer distance

A = affected by altitude

h = hand timing

OT = oversized track (> 200m in circumference)

X = annulled after doping revelations

Men

Women

Indoor

Men

Women

See also
Finnish Championships in Athletics

Notes

References
General
Finnish Outdoor Records 19 August 2022 updated
Finnish Indoor Records 29 January 2023 updated
Specific

External links
SUL web site

Finland
Athletics
Records
Athletics